The Breac Maodhóg (English: Speckled Shrine of Saint Maedog) is a relatively large Irish house-shaped reliquary, today in the National Museum of Ireland. It is thought to date from the second half of the 11th century, and while periods as early as the 9th century have been proposed, the later dating is believed more likely based on the style of its decoration.

The shrine is made from large plates of bronze on a wooden base, on which are placed series of relief figures on bronze plaques. It is best regarded for the individuality of these figure, as well other details in other panels give insight into contemporary ecclesiastical and social practices. At a height of 190mm and width of 92mm, it is relatively large compared to similar objects of its type. It was for centuries kept in a small decorated leather satchel added in the late medieval period, which is slightly too small for the shrine and is thought to have been originally designed to hold a manuscript.

Function
The shrine was probably used as a battle standard, when, as with the Cathach of St. Columba (Battler of Columba) it would have been carried onto the battlefield by a cleric to protect to the troops and perhaps bring victory. A medieval text on the life of the patron saint of the kings of Leinster, St Maedoc of Ferns, records how the kings of Breifne sought that "the famous wonder-working Breac [was] carried thrice around them" during battle.

Description

House-shaped (sometimes known as "tomb-shaped") reliquaries date to at least the 8th century. The figures in the Breac Maodhóg are made from bronze, but so finely moulded that they resemble wood carvings. Mostly clerics, saints and apostles, they are placed in groupings, some of which are now lost or badly damaged.  The surviving figures are given highly individualistic facial feature, expressions and poses. They wear elaborate hairstyles and are dressed in luxurious finery, and the folds of their flowing robes are highly detailed.  The figures are deeply moulded against the copper plates, to an extent that gives the appearance that they have been carved from wood.

The most well known figures are of two saints or clerics on the right hand side of the middle register. The saint on the left has a melancholy expression, drooping eyes, and holds his head in one hand, as if sighing. The musician on one side of the front-plate is playing what is thought to be the oldest extant visual representation of a harp. The figures resemble the form of the evangelists in the earlier Soiscél Molaisse, although, according to art historian Patrick Wallace, those on the Breac Maodhóg are "invested with a deeper humanity, character and humour. These wool-clad, tuniced, and cloaked, bearded and long haired figures seem to almost invite the viewer back to the early twelfth century."

Provenance
It was thought in the early modern period to have originated at Drumlane monastery, County Cavan, however its first mention, in a 15th-century "Life of the saint", describes its donation to the village of Rossinver, County Leitrim by the Bishop Máedóc of Ferns. Its provenance for many centuries is unclear, one account notes that the shrine was "preserved for centuries in Drumlane, and was stolen in the present century from the Roman Catholic priest of that parish". When first rediscovered, its hereditary keepers were the O'Farrelly family.

Condition
Due to its age, it is in very poor condition.

Gallery

References

Sources

 Crawford, Henry. "A Descriptive List of Irish Shrines and Reliquaries. Part I". The Journal of the Royal Society of Antiquaries of Ireland, 6th series, volume 13, no. 1, June 1923. 
 Laing, Lloyd. The Archaeology of Celtic Britain and Ireland: C.AD 400 - 1200.  Cambridge: Cambridge University Press, 2006.  
 Lucas, Anthony. "The Social Role of Relics and Reliquaries in Ancient Ireland". The Journal of the Royal Society of Antiquaries of Ireland, volume 116, 1986. 
 O'Toole, Fintan.  A History of Ireland in 100 Objects. Dublin: Royal Irish Academy, 2013.  
 Moss, Rachel. Medieval c. 400—c. 1600: Art and Architecture of Ireland. Yale University Press, 2014. 
 Murray, Griffin. "A Note on the Provenance of the Breac Maodhóg". The Journal of the Royal Society of Antiquaries of Ireland. Volume 135, 2005
 O'Neill, Timothy. The Irish Hand: Scribes and Their Manuscripts From the Earliest Times. Cork: Cork University Press, 2014. 
 Stalley, Roger. "Irish Art in the Romanesque and Gothic Periods". In:  Treasures of early Irish art, 1500 B.C. to 1500 A.D: From the collections of the National Museum of Ireland, Royal Irish Academy, Trinity College Dublin. NY: Metropolitan Museum of Art, 1977. 
 Wallace, Patrick. "Viking Age Ireland, AD 850-1150". In Ó'Floinn, Raghnal; Wallace, Patrick (eds). Treasures of the National Museum of Ireland: Irish Antiquities. National Museum of Ireland, 2002. 

Christian reliquaries
Collection of the National Museum of Ireland
House-shaped shrines
Irish art
Irish manuscripts